The athletics events at the 2007 Southeast Asian Games were held at the Main Stadium in His Majesty the King's 80th Birthday Anniversary, 5th December 2007 Sports Complex, Nakhon Ratchasima from 7 to 11 December.

Medal summary

Men

Women

Medal table

References
Clavelo Robinson, Javier (2007-12-08). Five records fall as Thailand takes the medal lead - South East Asia Games Day 1. IAAF. Retrieved on 2010-12-18.
Clavelo Robinson, Javier (2007-12-09). Gold aplenty for Vietnam and Philippines - SEA Games, Day 2 and 3. IAAF. Retrieved on 2010-12-18.
Clavelo Robinson, Javier (2007-12-10). 38.95 sec run continues Thai 4x100m dominance - SEA Games, Day 4. IAAF. Retrieved on 2010-12-18.
Clavelo Robinson, Javier (2007-12-12). Winatho’s 5889pts Heptathlon seals her third gold - SEA Games, Final Day. IAAF. Retrieved on 2010-12-18.
Archived official site results

External links
Southeast Asian Games Official site

 

2007 Southeast Asian Games events
2007
S
International athletics competitions hosted by Thailand